Phaleria chermsideana known as the scrub daphne grows as a shrub or small tree. Usually seen on the margins of rainforest in eastern Australia, north from Dorrigo, New South Wales to tropical Queensland.

References

chermsideana
Plants described in 1904
Flora of New South Wales
Flora of Queensland